Tomáš Kučera may refer to:

Tomáš Kučera (skier) (born 1948), Czechoslovakian Nordic combined skier
Tomáš Kučera (canoeist) (born 1985), Slovak slalom canoeist 
Tomáš Kučera (footballer, born 1977), Czech footballer who represented his country at the 2000 Summer Olympics
Tomáš Kučera (footballer, born 1980), Czech footballer
Tomáš Kučera (footballer, born 1984), Slovak footballer
Tomáš Kučera (footballer, born 1991), Czech footballer
Tomáš Kučera (Neded), Placebo Healer

See also
Kučera